Reginald Horace "Reggie" Bannister (born September 29, 1945) is an American musician, actor, producer, writer, and activist. He is known for his role as Reggie in the Phantasm film series.

Biography
Bannister is known for playing the gun-toting, ex-ice cream man Reggie in the Phantasm film series. Bannister starred in the films, which were directed by Don Coscarelli, alongside A. Michael Baldwin, Bill Thornbury, and Angus Scrimm. 

Bannister has appeared in several films and worked with such notables as Ossie Davis, Bruce Campbell, Ella Joyce, Daniel Roebuck, Andy Griffith, Joe Estevez and Andrew Divoff, and many others. Bannister has played many roles from Reggie in the Phantasm series to Herb Tooklander in the latest Stephen King adaption of One for the Road.

Along with co-producer Tim Sullivan and writer/director Paul Ward, he has also co-produced and starred in the short sequel to Salem's Lot, entitled, One for the Road. This film stars Bannister as well as Adam Robitel as Booth and Audrey Walters as Janey Lumley.

In 2012, Bannister and his wife, Gigi, have collaborated with co-writer Shelby McIntyre and co-writer/director Vito Trabucco on the comedy horror film Bloody Bloody Bible Camp. After having worked with Sullivan on One for the Road, Bannister had even asked Sullivan to co-produce and star in the film as the main villain, Sister Mary Chopper, which Sullivan accepted.

Music career
Bannister composed the song "Have You Seen It" (used in Phantasm IV: Oblivion) and arranged "Sittin' Here at Midnight" with Bill Thornbury (used in Phantasm).

Personal life

Reggie Bannister is a United States Military Veteran who served in Vietnam during the Vietnam War. Reggie states in an article "Getting back to the Vietnam thing. I was not for that war, I was against it, but there was this thing called the draft. I had friends who were going to Canada and I wasn't going to do that, I stand up to what's in front of me, and so just like anything else I just thought, 'Soldier? Really? You're gonna be a soldier? Okay, well then you're going to be the baddest-ass soldier that ever put on a uniform.' So I just took that attitude, Landon, and just went for it. I was a head radio operator for an automatic weapons specialty group." He was around .40-caliber weapons all the time, 40 and .50-caliber weapons and he's lost some of his hearing because of it. Reggie is a service connected disabled veteran because of it, on top of which he was exposed to Agent Orange." Reggie took his GI Bill from the military and he studied acting. 

Bannister currently resides in Crestline, California, where he lives with his wife.

Filmography
 Bonejangles (2017) – Edgar Sr.
 The Obsidian Curse (2016) – Professor Reginald M. Sydow
 Phantasm: Ravager (2016) – Reggie
 Bloody Bloody Bible Camp (2012) – Father Richard Cummings
 The Ghastly Love of Johnny X (2012) – King Clayton
 Not Another B Movie (2011) – Umpire
 Primitive (2011) – Dr. Stein
 One for the Road (2011) – Herb Tooklander
 Carnies (2009) – Detective Conrad Ellison
 Walking Distance (2009) – Webber
 Satan Hates You (2009) (post-production) – Mickey
 Small Town Saturday Night (2008) – Victor
 The Quiet Ones (2008) – Mr. Martino
 Text (2008) – Reggie
 The Rage (2007) – Uncle Ben
 The Final Curtain (2007) – Gus
 Fallen Angels (2006) – Radar
 Last Rites (2006) – Mitchell
 The Mangler Reborn (2005) – Rick
 Journeyman (2005) – McFearson
 Cemetery Gates (2004) – Belmont
 Bubba Ho-Tep (2002) – Care Home Administrator
 Up Against Amanda (2000) – Lead Guitar Ted
 Phantasm IV: Oblivion (1998) – Reggie
 Wishmaster (1997) – Pharmacist
 The Demolitionist (1995) - Warden Thomas
 Phantasm III: Lord of the Dead (1993) – Reggie
 That Little Monster (1994) – Twelvetrees
 Silent Night, Deadly Night 4: Initiation (1990) – Eli
 Survival Quest (1989) – Pilot
 Phantasm II (1988) – Reggie
 Phantasm (1979) – Reggie
 Jim the World's Greatest (1976) – O.D. Silengsly
 Kenny & Company (1976) – Donovan

Other work
 POV: An Actor's Insight (2009)
 Working with a Master: Don Coscarelli (2006)
 Phantasmagoria (2005) Documentary on Phantasm (V)
 Phantasmagorical Mystery Tour (2005) (V)
 Making of 'Bubba Ho-tep' (2004)

References

External links

American male film actors
Male actors from Long Beach, California
1945 births
Living people
American male screenwriters
American male singers
American male composers
20th-century American composers
Musicians from Long Beach, California
Film directors from California
Singers from California
Guitarists from California
20th-century American guitarists
Screenwriters from California
American male guitarists
20th-century American male musicians
The Young Americans members